Kelham Island may refer to:
Kelham Island Quarter, one of the eleven quarters of Sheffield City Centre
Kelham Island Museum, an industrial museum, part of the Sheffield Industrial Museums Trust, located in the above quarter
Kelham Island Brewery, a brewery located in the above quarter